Karin Nathalie Ruckstuhl (born 2 November 1980 in Baden, Switzerland) is a Dutch heptathlete.

Biography
Her first major championship was the 2002 European Athletics Championships, and she finished 13th in the heptathlon. She came close to the podium at the 2004 IAAF World Indoor Championships, finishing fourth, and took part in her first Olympics at the 2004 Athens Games, where she was 16th in the final rankings with a national record of 6108 points. She again just fell short of the podium with a fourth place at the 2005 European Athletics Indoor Championships and was eighth outdoors at the 2005 World Championships in Athletics later that season.

The 2006 season was a breakthrough for Ruckstuhl – she won silver medals at the 2006 IAAF World Indoor Championships and the 2006 European Athletics Championships in Gothenburg. Her new record performance of 6423 points at the European Championships (a Dutch record) meant that she was ranked fourth in the world in the heptathlon that year. She also improved indoors, registering a national record of 4801 points in the women's pentathlon for the bronze medal at the 2007 European Athletics Indoor Championships. However, she did not manage to finish the heptathlon at that year's major competition – the 2007 World Championships in Athletics.

She suffered a herniated disc in her back and underwent surgery in 2008. Her time out from the sport was extended even further after she injured her Achilles tendon in February 2010. Following such serious injuries and some two and a half years away from top level competition, she decided to stop competing in multi-sport events and focused her efforts on just long jumping.

Achievements

References

 Bijkerk, T. (2004) Olympisch Oranje. De Vrieseborch

External links

1980 births
Living people
Dutch heptathletes
Olympic athletes of the Netherlands
Athletes (track and field) at the 2004 Summer Olympics
People from Baden, Switzerland
Swiss emigrants to the Netherlands
European Athletics Championships medalists